The Koopssus (Special Operations Command), is a special forces unit of the Indonesian National Armed Forces with counter-terrorism duties. The unit operates and was formed similarly to the United States Joint Special Operations Command (JSOC) to execute special operations missions worldwide.

History 
The Koopssus was established in 2015. At that time, this force consisted of 90 people who would serve in operational status.

Revisions to Indonesia's anti-terror laws, which were passed in 2018, allowed the military to be formally involved in counter-terrorism operations. Until then, the Indonesian National Police’s elite wing, the Detachment 88 (Densus 88), had been the country's lead security unit in pursuing terrorists. The Special Operations Command was established on 30 July 2019, thru President Decree No. 42/2019 and Commander of the Armed Forces Regulation No. 19/2019.

Organization 
According to Commander of the Indonesian National Armed Forces Air Marshal Hadi Tjahjanto, the Koopssus consists of 500 personnel drawn from the army, navy and air force. About 400 Koopssus personnel carry out preventive measures, including surveillance and intelligence, while the remaining 100 members are tasked with confronting terrorist acts.

Commander 
The Koopssus is to be commanded by a two-star general officer, while the minimum position is a one-star general officer. Brigadier General Rochadi has been appointed on 30 July 2019 as the unit's first commander.

Organization Structure 
Based on Commander of the Armed Forces Regulation No. 19/2019, Koopssus organization divided into 4 parts: Leadership, Assistants, Servicing Echelons, and Executive Operators. For Executive Operators, only 1 out of 7 executive operators is permanent body member of the Koopssus, while other executive operators are non-permanent body members provided by Indonesian National Armed Forces. Koopssus consisted by:

 Leadership Elements
 Office of the Commander of Koopssus
 Office of the Deputy Commander of Koopssus
 Assistants to the Commander (Planning, Operations, Personnel, Logistics, Communication and Electronics) 
 Servicing Echelons
 Koopssus HQ Detachment
 Administration Staff Coordinator 
 Executive Operators
 Permanent Intelligence Force Command
 Special Force Command (Non-permanent, per assignment basis)
 Sat-81
 Denjaka
 Bravo Detachment 90 
 Force Strengthening Command (Non-permanent, per assignment basis)
 Special Sea Operation Force Command (Non-permanent, per assignment basis)
 Special Air Operation Force Command (Non-permanent, per assignment basis)
 Special Force Assistance Operation Command (Non-permanent, per assignment basis)
 Supporting Command (Non-permanent, per assignment basis)

Mission 
President of Indonesia Joko Widodo signed, on 3 July 2019, a presidential decree clarifying the military's expanded role in counter-terrorism. Koopssus is to be coordinated with the Indonesian National Police in carrying out its mission of responding to high-intensity terror acts.

According to the Decree, the Koopssus is in charge of conducting special operations and activities to safeguard the Indonesian national interests both at home and abroad.

Reactions 
The speaker of the House of Representatives, Bambang Soesatyo, said he hoped that the formation of Koopssus would also strengthen the monitoring of cyberspace.

According to Air Marshal Hadi Tjahjanto, the establishment of the unit is an implementation of the 11 Priority Programs, a military program to deal with a spectrum of threats.

See also 
 Kopassus
 Denjaka
 Bravo Detachment 90

References 

Special forces of Indonesia
Military units and formations established in 2019